Outer London is the name for the group of London boroughs that form a ring around Inner London. Together, the inner and outer boroughs form London, the capital city of the United Kingdom.

These were areas that were not part of the County of London and became formally part of Greater London in 1965. An exception is North Woolwich, which was in the County of London but was transferred to Newham in 1965.

London Government Act 1963
The Outer London boroughs were defined by the London Government Act 1963. The main difference between Inner and Outer London boroughs between 1965 and 1990 was that the outer boroughs were local education authorities. The statutory Outer London boroughs are:

ONS definition (statistics)
The Office for National Statistics and the Census define Outer London differently, excluding  Haringey and Newham (which are defined as Inner London), and including Greenwich. This is reflected in the Nomenclature of Territorial Units for Statistics (NUTS) classification.  Under this classification, Outer London consists of Barking and Dagenham, Barnet, Bexley, Brent, Bromley, Croydon, Ealing, Enfield, Greenwich, Harrow, Havering, Hillingdon, Hounslow, Kingston upon Thames, Merton, Redbridge, Richmond upon Thames, Sutton, and Waltham Forest.

Figures here are for the Office for National Statistics defined Outer London (in its 2001 limits), whose land area is 1,254 km2 (484 sq. miles). Figures before 1971 have been reconstructed by the Office for National Statistics based on past censuses in order to fit the 2001 limits. Figures from 1981 onward are midyear estimates, with those for 2002 to 2009 having been revised during 2010. These mid-year estimates are more accurate than the censuses themselves, which are known to underestimate the population of London.

Outer London continued to grow as population moved from Inner London, reaching a peak in 1951 at 4,517,588. The population of Greater London as a whole then started to decline, and the Outer London population fell to 4,230,000 in 1991, before starting to increase again, passing the 1951 peak with a population of 4,942,040 in 2011.

Strategic planning
For the purposes of the London Plan planning document produced by the Mayor of London, Outer London consists of the statutory Outer London boroughs, with the exception of Newham.

Other definitions
From 1990 to 2000 London used two telephone area codes with separate codes for 'Inner London' and 'Outer London' (originally 071 and 081 respectively, becoming 0171 and 0181 in 1995). The area covered by the 'Outer London' code was widely different from all of the above definitions. 
In 2000, London returned to using a single 020 area code and all official distinctions between 'inner' and 'outer' London numbers ceased at this time.

See also 
 Central London
 East London
 Inner London
 North London
 South London
 West London

References

London sub-regions
London Outer